A list of the earliest films produced in the Cinema of Nepal, ordered by year of release from 1978 to 1999.

For an alphabetical list of articles on Nepalese films, see :Category:Nepalese films.

Early Cinema (1951-1980)

1981-1990

1991-1995

1996

1997

1998

1999

References

1978
Nepal
Nepal
Nepal
Films
Films
Films